The Johnston Center for Integrative Studies is an alternative education program offered by the University of Redlands in Redlands, California. The Johnston Center focuses on interdisciplinary education, in which students design the curriculum for their personal program of study. The program emphasizes cross-cultural learning, typically requiring the student to study abroad for at least a semester, and also emphasizes the importance of community interaction in its on-campus residential housing. Students have the ability to re-negotiate the content of courses they take; and to create courses. They write a self-evaluation at the end of each class and receive written evaluations rather than grades.

History of Johnston
Guided by the example of the  Claremont College Consortium, in 1965 planning started for an experimental college attached to the University of Redlands. The intention was to develop a like consortium of colleges that would strengthen the reputation and resources of all member institutions. James Graham Johnston, of IBM, made the founding grant, and three new buildings were constructed exclusively for Johnston. The trustees hired Dr. Presley McCoy as the first Chancellor.

An opportunity was made where unique thinkers, such as professors from Ivy League and top West Coast Universities who wanted less institutional constraint, could creatively interact with the educational desires of bright and talented students who sought with a unique perspective.
     
Johnston College opened on September 2, 1969 with 89 male and 92 female students. Born in the midst of the Free Speech Movement, Johnston immediately became controversial. Chancellor McCoy declared, "We have the right to determine our own social rules" over the conventions of the University. Town and gown relations became further strained when McCoy hired Jeanne Friedman, an alleged Communist, as a faculty member, after her arrest for two felonies at Stanford. Johnston College lost support, and became a financial burden on the University, though it continued to operate as an autonomous unit for approximately 10 years. In 1979, it was integrated into the College of Arts and Sciences (CAS) as the Johnston Center for Individualized Studies. It operated under that name until the mid-1990s, when it was renamed The Johnston Center for Integrative Studies.

Graduation contracts

A Johnston Graduation Contract (abbreviated Grad contract) outlines what a student studies at Johnston. Written by the student as a proposal, then subject to review, it is made up of a narrative and a course list. The narrative is a short outline of what subjects the student wants to integrate and what they want to learn. The course list includes courses that have already been taken and courses that will be taken in order to fulfill the learning outlined in the narrative.

A grad contract needs to satisfy the breath and depth expectations of the College of Arts and Sciences. Breadth means studying a broad array of subjects and fields (math, science, literature, religion, etc.). Traditional CAS  students fulfill their breadth requirements by completing courses in the Liberal Arts Foundation (LAF). A Johnston student can negotiate how sufficient breadth will be achieved. Depth means having a deep understanding of the particular subjects that one wants to study. Traditional CAS students fulfill their depth requirement by completing a major. A Johnston student's depth comes in a personally designed emphasis.

A grad contract also needs to include a cross cultural experience (CCE). Most students fulfill their CCE by traveling abroad usually in either their Junior or Senior years. A CCE is an opportunity in which the student experiences first-hand a culture that is not their own and helps them to understand the world from a cultural context outside of what they already know.

For a grad contract to be passed the student goes before a Grad Contract Committee. The committee consists of the student's advisor, three other professors, and two Johnston students who have already had their grad contract passed. The committee reads the narrative before the meeting and asks the student questions about what they want to study and why and gives them ideas on how to increase their breadth and depth and gives them extra options to consider. If the committee feels that there is an integral component left out of the narrative and/or course list, the committee can make a stipulation (a demand of sorts) which the student must agree to before the contract is approved.

Course contracts

Johnston students can write contracts for most courses that they take (they need the professor's approval for traditional CAS courses). All students (including traditional CAS students) must take Johnston seminars for evaluation and must write a contract. With these contracts they can customize the course to meet their learning and educational needs; it is how the Johnston student takes responsibility and control of their education. The student can contract to do certain requirements outlined in the syllabus while substituting particular requirements in the syllabus with something else. For example, instead of taking quizzes a student could write a short paper or instead of taking a written final a student could take a dialogical final. Students can also increase the number of units the class is for by doing more work or decrease the number of units by doing less work, though either and any of these changes to a class syllabus must be negotiated between the student and the professor.

Whenever a class is contracted, a student must write out a contract, a self-evaluation, and a professor evaluation. A copy of the contract is turned into the Johnston Registar, Teresa Area. Self-Evaluations are to be written at the end of the course and they should explain what the student studied, what they learned and how well they accomplished what they contracted to do. Self-Evaluations are very important so they should be as detailed as possible. Professor evaluations detail how well the professor taught and how useful they were in the learning experience. After the end of a course (and usually within about a semester) the student will receive an evaluation of how well they did in the course. Johnston students receive written evaluations  from their professors instead of letter (A-F) or numerical (4.0-0.0) grades. Courses that are not Johnston seminars  do not have to be taken for an evaluation and if the student so chooses they may take the course for a letter/numerical grade; but in most instances it is recommended that they are taken for evaluation.

Johnston students are also encouraged, typically as part of finalizing their graduate contract, to teach or co-teach, a course that best exemplifies their accumulated knowledge base. While not a requirement, the communal nature of peer based classroom experiences is often seen as a senior capstone project, with a faculty adviser contributing to the intended syllabus. Previous courses taught by Johnston Students include (but are certainly not limited to!); Books That Make You Want To Write, Feminism in Literature, Media Bias, Woodworking Haphazardly, Survivalism, Ecology and Interactions, Ecofeminism, Industriomasculinity, Nietzsche's Philosophy, and Sustainable Agriculture. In addition to receiving a final written evaluation from the peer-professor pair, students are expected to write Self Evaluations aimed at improving instructor-student understanding of how the course, teacher, and student, met or failed to meet contract expectations.

Community

Many Johnston students take pride in living as part of an intentional community. Johnston has two dorms, Bekins Hall and Bekins-Holt Hall (often known as Holt Hall), which are collectively known as the Johnston Complex. Community meetings are held every Tuesday at 4pm. At these meetings, community members (students and faculty) discuss current developments in the social and educational operation of the Johnston Center, and consider proposals for the use of student funds held for collectively agreed-upon projects such as art shows. 
Smoking cigarettes was once allowed on the balcony of Bekins Hall but was banned following a fire in 2006.

Notable alumni
Lynne Isbell (born 1955), primatologist

References

University of Redlands